Central European History is a quarterly peer-reviewed academic journal on history published by Cambridge University Press on behalf of the Central European History Society, an affiliate of the American Historical Association. It covers all aspects of central European history from the Middle Ages to the present day. It was established in 1968 and is edited by Monica Black and Mirna Zakic.

The journal was published by Brill Publishers in the past.

References

External links

Central European History at JSTOR

Publications established in 1968
European history journals
Quarterly journals
Cambridge University Press academic journals
English-language journals
Academic journals associated with learned and professional societies of the United States